Todd Szegedy (born May 6, 1976) is an American racecar driver. He was the 2003 champion of the NASCAR Whelen Modified Tour.

Busch Series career
In 2004, he competed in three NASCAR Busch Series races for NEMCO Motorsports in the No. 7 and No. 87 Chevrolets, with an average finish of 25th place. He made his Busch Series debut at the Milwaukee Mile starting in the 23rd position and finishing 21st. His best career finish came at the Memphis Motorsports Park which he started 37th and finished 15th.

He is probably best remembered by NASCAR fans for an incident that took place during his qualifying run for his 2nd career start, which came at Chicagoland Speedway in July of 2004 in the No. 7 NEMCO car. During his run, a gigantic inflatable orange promoting race sponsor Tropicana was blown by the wind onto the racing surface, forcing Szegedy to dodge it. Szegedy was granted another qualifying attempt and qualified 12th.

Whelen Modified career
Szegedy resumed driving in the Whelen Modified Tour part-time since 2000. Currently he has 19 career wins along with 11 pole positions. He was awarded win number 16 in 2011 at New Hampshire Motor Speedway after Ryan Newman's car was disqualified after failing post race inspection.

Motorsports career results

NASCAR
(key) (Bold – Pole position awarded by qualifying time. Italics – Pole position earned by points standings or practice time. * – Most laps led.)

Busch Series

Whelen Modified Tour

Whelen Southern Modified Tour

References

External links
 

1976 births
Living people
NASCAR drivers
People from Ridgefield, Connecticut
Racing drivers from Connecticut